Tegulaherpia is a genus of pholidoskepian solenogasters, shell-less, worm-like,  marine  mollusks.
Its sclerites are flattened and resemble the sclerites of Halkieria.

References

Pholidoskepia